Whaling is the hunting of whales.

"Whaling" may also refer to:
 Whaling, the use of email scams to target high-level executives and other corporate targets; see  phishing
 "Whaling" (song), a 1983 song by New Zealand band DD Smash
 Bert Whaling (1888–1965), American baseball player
 William Whaling (1894–1989), American sport shooter
 Spending a large amount of money on free-to-play video games